The Monoscutidae are a family of harvestmen with 32 known species that all occur in or near Australia and New Zealand.

Species range in body length from two to three millimeters (Monoscutinae) and three to ten mm (Megalopsalidinae). The chelicerae are enormously enlarged in males of the subfamily Megalopsalidinae. Most species are coloured in shades of browns to black. Megalopsalis inconstans is jet black with bright orange patches on the carapace; Acihasta salebrosa is tan and brown with many white and gold specks over the dorsum.

The Monoscutidae are closely related to the Neopilionidae, which also occur in the Southern hemisphere.

Species
 Megalopsalidinae Forster, 1949

 Megalopsalis Roewer, 1923
 Megalopsalis serritarsus (Sørensen, 1886) (New South Wales; type species)
 Megalopsalis chiltoni (Hogg, 1910) (New Zealand)
 Megalopsalis chiltoni (Hogg, 1910)
 Megalopsalis nigra Forster, 1944 (New Zealand)
 Megalopsalis distincta (Forster, 1964) (New Zealand - Auckland Island)
 Megalopsalis fabulosa (Phillips & Grimmett, 1932) (New Zealand)
 Megalopsalis grayi (Hogg, 1920) (New Zealand)
 Megalopsalis grimmetti Forster, 1944 (New Zealand)
 Megalopsalis hoggi (Pocock, 1902) (Victoria)
 Megalopsalis inconstans Forster, 1944 (New Zealand)
 Megalopsalis marplesi Forster, 1944 (New Zealand)
 Megalopsalis triascuta Forster, 1944 (New Zealand)
 Megalopsalis tumida Forster, 1944 (New Zealand)
 Megalopsalis turneri Marples, 1944 (New Zealand)
 Megalopsalis wattsi (Hogg, 1920) (New Zealand)

 Pantopsalis Simon, 1879
 Pantopsalis listeri (White, 1849) (New Zealand; type species)
 Pantopsalis albipalpis Pocock, 1903 (New Zealand)
 Synonyms: Pantopsalis nigripalpis Pocock, 1902
     Pantopsalis nigripalpis spiculosa Pocock, 1902
     Pantopsalis jenningsi Pocock, 1903
 Pantopsalis cheliferoides (Colenso, 1882) (New Zealand)
 Pantopsalis coronata Pocock, 1903 (New Zealand)
 Synonym: Pantopsalis trippi Pocock, 1903
 Pantopsalis johnsi Forster, 1964 (New Zealand - Auckland Island)
 Synonym: Pantopsalis mila Forster, 1964
 Pantopsalis luna (Forster, 1944) (New Zealand)
 Pantopsalis phocator Taylor, 2004 (New Zealand)
 Pantopsalis pococki Hogg, 1920 (New Zealand)
 Pantopsalis rennelli Forster, 1964 (New Zealand - Campbell Island)
 Pantopsalis snaresensis Forster, 1964 (New Zealand - Snares Island

 Spinicrus Forster, 1949
 Spinicrus tasmanicum (Hogg, 1910) (Tasmania; type species)
 Spinicrus camelus Forster, 1949 (New South Wales)
 Spinicrus continentalis (Roewer, 1923) (Queensland)
 Spinicrus minimum Kauri, 1954 (Western Australia)
 Spinicrus nigricans Hickman, 1957 (Tasmania)
 Spinicrus porongorupense Kauri, 1954 (Western Australia)
 Spinicrus stewarti Forster, 1949 (Victoria)
 Spinicrus thrypticum Hickman, 1957 (Tasmania)

 Monoscutinae Forster, 1948

 Acihasta Forster, 1948
 Acihasta salebrosa Forster, 1948 (New Zealand - Three Kings Islands)

 Monoscutum Forster, 1948
 Monoscutum titirangiensis Forster, 1948 (New Zealand)

 Templar Taylor, 2008
 Templar incongruens Taylor, 2008 (New Zealand)

Footnotes

References
 Forster, R. R. 1964. The Araneae and Opiliones of the sub-Antarctic islands of New Zealand. Pacific Insects Monograph 7: 58-115.
 's Biology Catalog: Monoscutidae
  (eds.) (2007): Harvestmen - The Biology of Opiliones. Harvard University Press 
 Taylor, C. K. 2004. New Zealand harvestmen of the subfamily Megalopsalidinae (Opiliones: Monoscutidae) - the genus Pantopsalis. Tuhinga 15: 53-76.
 Taylor, C. K. 2008. A new species of Monoscutinae (Arachnida, Opiliones, Monoscutidae) from New Zealand, with a redescription of Monoscutum titirangiense. Journal of Arachnology 36: 176-179.

Arachnids of Australia
Arachnids of New Zealand
Harvestman families

fr:Monoscutidae